Podocarpus spicatus can refer to:

Podocarpus spicatus Poepp., a synonym of Prumnopitys andina (Poepp. ex Endl.) de Laub.
Podocarpus spicatus R.Br., a synonym of Prumnopitys taxifolia (Sol. ex D.Don) de Laub.